Mary Jayne Harrelson (married name Reeves; born June 17, 1978, in Roxboro, North Carolina) is a female middle distance runner from the United States. She won a silver medal in the women's 1,500 metres event at the 2003 Pan American Games in Santo Domingo, Dominican Republic, behind Cuba's Adriana Muñoz.

College career
Harrelson competed collegiately at Appalachian State University. She become one of the most accomplished athletes in SoCon history, winning 23 individual championships. She was a six-time All-American performer in outdoor track. In 1999 and 2001, Harrelson was the 1500 meters national champion at the NCAA outdoor track & field championships. In cross country, Harrelson was a conference champion three straight years (1998–2000) and qualified for the NCAA championships each of those seasons.

She was inducted into the Appalachian State Athletic Hall of Fame in 2006.

References

External links 

Profile

1978 births
Living people
People from Roxboro, North Carolina
American female middle-distance runners
Pan American Games medalists in athletics (track and field)
Athletes (track and field) at the 2003 Pan American Games
Athletes (track and field) at the 2007 Pan American Games
Appalachian State University alumni
Pan American Games silver medalists for the United States
Medalists at the 2003 Pan American Games
Medalists at the 2007 Pan American Games